Ahmed Mekky (born June 19, 1980) is an Egyptian actor, writer, director and rapper.

Personal life
Ahmed Mekky was born in Oran, Algeria as a son of an Egyptian mother and an Algerian father. He was raised as a boy in the Talbia of Haram District, Giza, Egypt, where he filmed his Egyptian patriotic song clip "Wa'fet Nasyt Zaman".
Mekky paused his career for a period of time after suffering from Epstein Barr virus (EBV) infection. He caught the virus after sharing water bottles with his fellow boxing trainees.

Mekky married an Egyptian businesswoman, with whom he has one son, Adham. They divorced in 2013.

Career
Mekky began his career after graduating from the directing division at Cairo Higher Institute of Cinema. Mekky started out directing several short films such as Yabanee Asly (An Original Japanese) before directing El Hassa El Sab'a (The Seventh Sense), which starred Ahmed El-Fishawy, in 2005. That work was adapted from a short film that Mekky had previously directed in 2003. Mekky has collaborated with his sister Enas Mekky in directing several television productions, including Lahazat Hariga (Crucial Moments) and Tamer Wa Shaw'eyyah (Tamer and Shaweiyah) in which he also played the role of Haitham Dabour.

Mekky stars in the Ramadan Egyptian comedy series El Kabeer Awy in which he plays both main characters, two brothers vying for the inheritance of their deceased father. In 2013, the third season of El Kabeer Awy introduces a third brother, also played by Mekky. Besides his career in cinema, Mekky has also continued to write rap songs that he performs in films or uploads to the internet.

Music 
Ahmed Mekky is also a well known and popular figure in Egyptian rap; he released many successful hits such as "Masr Baldy" and "Wa'fet Nasyt Zaman" in 2017. Mekky's "Atr Al Hayah" from the album Asloh Araby (2012) samples Galt MacDermot's "Coffee Cold".

References

External links
 

1980 births
Living people
Egyptian male film actors
Egyptian comedians
21st-century Egyptian male singers
Egyptian rappers
People from Giza
Egyptian male television actors
Singers who perform in Egyptian Arabic
Egyptian people of Algerian descent
Cairo Higher Institute of Cinema alumni